The Tobiads were a Jewish faction in Ammon at the beginning of the Hasmonean period. They were philhellene, supporters of Hellenistic Judaism, in the early years of the 2nd century BCE.

What is known about the Tobiads is a combination of statements of Josephus (Antiquities of the Jews xii. 160-236) and of 2 Maccabees . There are two accounts, both legendary, the hero of the one being Joseph, and of the other, Hyrcanus.

Narrative
During the reign of the Egyptian king Ptolemy and his wife Cleopatra, the high priest Onias, who was feeble-minded and extremely miserly, refused to pay the Jewish tribute of twenty talents which his father, Simon the Just, had always given from his own means. In his anger the king sent Athenion as a special envoy to Jerusalem, threatening to seize the land of the Jews and to hold it by force of arms if the money was not forthcoming. Although the high priest disregarded this threat, the people were greatly excited, whereupon Onias' nephew Joseph, a son of Tobias and a man greatly beloved and respected for his wisdom and piety, reproached his uncle for bringing disaster upon the people, declaring, moreover, that Onias ruled the Jews and held the high priestly office solely for the sake of gain. He told him, furthermore, that he ought at all events to go to the king and petition him to remit the tribute-money, or at least a part of it. Onias, on the other hand, replied that he did not wish to rule, and expressed himself as willing to resign the high-priesthood, although he refused to petition the king. He permitted Joseph, however, to go to Ptolemy, and also to speak to the people. Joseph quieted the Jews, and received the envoy hospitably in his own house, besides giving him costly presents, so that, when Athenion returned to Alexandria, he informed the king of the coming of Joseph, whom he styled the ruler (προστάτης) [prostatis] of the people. Shortly afterward Joseph started on his journey, having first raised a loan of about 20,000 drachmae in Samaria, although he was obliged to submit to the jeers of prominent men of Syria and Phoenicia, who were visiting Alexandria in order to farm the taxes, and who derided him on account of his insignificant appearance.

Not finding Ptolemy at Alexandria, Joseph went to meet him at Memphis, where the king graciously granted him a seat in his own chariot, together with the queen and Athenion. His cleverness won for him the monarch's friendship; and by his offer of 16,000 talents against the 8,000 bid by his opponents he secured the contract for farming the taxes, the king and queen becoming his sureties, since he did not have sufficient ready money. He left Alexandria with 500 talents and 2,000 soldiers, and by punishing all who opposed him in Ashkelon and Scythopolis and confiscating their estates, he made himself feared through all the cities of Syria and Phoenicia, while the great fortune which his extortions won was held secure by his continual presents to the king, queen, and courtiers, so that he retained his office of tax-farmer until his death, twenty-two years later. By his first wife Joseph had seven sons. At Alexandria he became infatuated with a dancer, for whom his brother Solymius, who lived in the city, substituted his own daughter, the child of this union being Hyrcanus, who was his father's favorite son and consequently the object of his brothers' enmity.

Josephus describes Joseph as "a good man, and of great magnanimity" who "brought the Jews out of a state of poverty and meanness to one that was more splendid. He retained the farming of the taxes of Syria, and Phenicia, and Samaria twenty-two years."

On the birth of a prince, Joseph feeling too old to visit Alexandria and his other sons likewise declining to go, sent Hyrcanus to bear his congratulations to the court. Arion, Joseph's representative in Alexandria, however, refused to allow Hyrcanus money, and the latter accordingly put him in chains, not only escaping punishment from the king, but even winning both his favor and that of the courtiers, whose aid his brothers had secretly invoked against him. The king sent letters recommending him warmly to his father. When Hyrcanus returned to Judaea, his older brothers met him with armed resistance. Hyrcanus won the battle and killed two of his half-brothers but as the city of Jerusalem refused to admit him, he settled beyond the Jordan.

Shortly afterwards, Seleucus IV Philopator (187-175 BC) become king of the Seleucid kingdom. Hyrcanus's father Joseph and his uncle, Onias II, also died. The high-priesthood passed to Simon II (219–199 BC). Hyrcanus continued his warfare against the Arabs beyond the Jordan and, in the vicinity of Heshbon, built the castle of Tyre, and ruling the district east of the Jordan for seven years during the reign of Seuleucus IV. Ptolemy V Epiphanes (205-182) also died, leaving two young sons. When Antiochus Epiphanes became king of Syria (175-164 BC), Hyrcanus realized that he would be unable to vindicate himself for his murderous attacks upon the Arabs, he committed suicide, and his property was seized by Antiochus.

Comparison of accounts

The most serious difficulty, however, is the chronology. An old interpolator of Josephus advanced the opinion that the king mentioned in the story was Ptolemy III Euergetes (246-222 BC). However, this monarch was not the consort of a Cleopatra, nor was his immediate successor Seleucus IV. The only ruler to whom the narrative can properly refer is Ptolemy V Epiphanes (205-182), who in 193 BCE married Cleopatra, the daughter of Antiochus III. In that case, however, Joseph could not have farmed the Egyptian taxes, since Cœle-Syria was then under Syrian, and not under Egyptian, suzerainty, while the assertion that the two powers had divided the revenues of the country is merely an attempt on the part of Josephus to evade the difficulty. Nor was the period between Ptolemy V's marriage (193) and his death (182) sufficiently long to agree with the statement concerning the length of time during which Joseph farmed the taxes (twenty-two years), and still less could Hyrcanus have reached manhood in so short a space.

Büchler, therefore, finds himself compelled to place Joseph's term of office between 219 and 199, although this stultifies the statement of Josephus regarding a division of the taxes.

Critical views

Büchler's researches probably established the historicity of the account of the Tobiads. 1 Maccabees makes no mention of these events. The quarrels were factional ones, the issue being whether the old and popular government of the Ptolemies should continue, or whether the Jews should deliver themselves over to the Syrian kings and their Hellenization.

When Jason and Menelaus struggled for the dominant power in Jerusalem, which was, according to Büchler, political office (the προστασία [prostasia] mentioned in the account of the Tobiads), and no longer the high priesthood, the sons of Tobias (Τωβίου παῖδες) [Tobiou paides] took sides with Menelaus
 
Wellhausen denied both the historicity and the value of the narrative, although he thinks that the portion dealing with the period of Seleucus IV and Antiochus IV may be trustworthy, and he regards the suicide of Hyrcanus as probable, since the latter supported the Ptolemies against the new régime of the Syrians, and might consequently fear the revenge of Antiochus IV. II Macc. iii. 11 mentions money deposited by Hyrcanus, the son of Tobias, "a man of great dignity", taking it for granted that a friendship existed between Onias II and Hyrcanus, a supposition which is very reasonable, since only the other Tobiads, the brothers of Hyrcanus, were involved in quarrels with the legitimate high priest. That Hyrcanus is called the son of Tobias, and not of Joseph, is due, Wellhausen holds, to mere abbreviation, and does not imply any divergency in the two accounts.

Willreich distinguishes a threefold tradition concerning the Tobiads, the first being that of the Pseudo-Hecataeus (according to Willreich's interpretation), which represents Onias as a worthy man, and attributes to the Tobiads all the misfortunes which befell the Jews. The account of Josephus, on the other hand, which represents Onias as a weakling and the Tobiads as the promoters of Israel's welfare, is drawn from Samaritan sources. With this theory Büchler also agrees, thus explaining why Joseph sought aid in Samaria, and why the account fails to express disapproval of the non-Jewish conduct of Joseph, who ate at the court of an Egyptian king and had dealings with Gentiles. Willreich likewise brings the Tobiads into association both with Tobiah, the servant mentioned by Nehemiah as an Ammonite (ii. 19), who consequently came from the east-Jordanic district, and with the Tubieni, who were the enemies of the Jews. Although Willreich does not absolutely deny the historicity of the narrative, since the castle of Hyrcanus has been discovered in modern times, he regards Joseph and Hyrcanus as mere names, representing in part Jason and Menelaus. The third form of the tradition is that of Jason of Cyrene, on which the second Book of the Maccabees is based; and Schlatter is even of the opinion that Josephus himself drew his account of the Tobiads from this same source.

Büchler regards the struggle between the Tobiads and the Oniads as a contest between Ptolemean and Seleucid supremacy in Jerusalem. According to the same scholar, moreover, Menelaus and Jason themselves were Tobiads, although this is denied by Schürer.

Many points of the Tobiad problem still await solution.

References

Willreich, Juden und Griechen vor der Makkabäischen Erhebung, pp. 64–107, Göttingen, 1895;
Wellhausen, I. J. G. 4th ed., pp. 243–246;
Büchler, Tobiaden und Oniaden, Vienna, 1899;
Schlatter, in Theologische Studien und Kritiken, 1891;
Heinrich Grätz, in Monatsschrift, 1872;
Emil Schürer, Gesch. 3d ed., i. 195

Notes

External links
A New Look at the Tobiads in 'Iraq Al Amir (PDF)

Seleucid Jews